Doctor of Fine Arts (D.F.A.) is a doctoral degree in fine arts, may be given as an honorary degree (a degree honoris causa) or an earned professional degree (in the UK).

Description
Doctoral programmes leading to DFAs are of equivalent level to a PhD/JD/MD/DO, with the same requirement to demonstrate new knowledge, but typically contain a practical component and a more structured programme of learning than a PhD/JD/MD/DO. DFA programmes are offered by universities including University of Hertfordshire and University of East London.

The honorary degree is typically conferred to honor the recipient who has made a significant contribution to society in the arts. Notable individuals who have received the honor include Taylor Swift, Frank Stella, Richard Serra, Stephen Colbert, Carmen De Lavallade, Anna Deavere Smith, Jacques d'Amboise, Bill Pullman, Abelardo Morell, Twyla Tharp, Gordon Parks,  Jack Nicholson, Jodie Foster, and Meryl Streep.

At Yale University, the DFA is an earned degree conferred on students who hold a Master of Fine Arts degree in dramaturgy and dramatic criticism from the Yale School of Drama, and who have "completed MFA qualifying comprehensive examinations, and have written a dissertation of distinction whose subject has been approved by the DFA committee" of faculty.

In 2016 ELIA (European League of the Institutes of the Arts) launched The Florence Principles on the Doctorate in the Arts.  The Florence Principles relating to the Salzburg Principles and the Salzburg Recommendations of EUA (European University Association) name seven points of attention to specify the Doctorate / Ph.D. in the Arts compared to a scientific doctorate / Ph.D. The Florence Principles have been endorsed and are supported also by AEC, CILECT, CUMULUS and SAR.

See also
Doctor of Arts (D.A.) – sometimes an honorary and sometimes an earned degree
Doctor of Humane Letters (D.H.L.) – typically an honorary degree
Doctor of Music (D.Mus., D.M. or Mus.D.) – sometimes an honorary and sometimes an earned degree
Doctor of Philosophy (Ph.D.) – typically an earned degree

References

Doctoral degrees
Honorary degrees